Pseudotolida multisulcata is a beetle in the genus Pseudotolida of the family Mordellidae. It was described in 1966 by Nomura.

References

Mordellidae
Beetles described in 1966